Ukrainians may refer to:

 in terms of ethnicity: Ukrainians, an East Slavic people, from Eastern Europe
 in terms of citizenship:  Ukrainians (citizens), citizens of Ukraine, a country in Eastern Europe
 in music: The Ukrainians, a band from the United Kingdom
 The Ukrainians (album), a 1991 album by the band
 Montreal Ukrainians, a sports team in Montreal, Quebec, Canada
 Toronto Ukrainians, a sports team in Toronto, Ontario, Canada

See also

 Ukrainian Orthodox Church (disambiguation)
 Ukrainian (disambiguation)
 Ukraine (disambiguation)
 Ukraina (disambiguation)
 Ukrainia (disambiguation)
 Afro-Ukrainians
 Languages of Ukraine
 Name of Ukraine